The United Arab Emirates cricket team toured Zimbabwe in April 2019 to play four One Day International (ODI) matches. It was the first time that the United Arab Emirates played a Full Member side in a bilateral series.

Ahead of the tour, Zimbabwe named a 27-man training squad. Zimbabwe's regular captain, Hamilton Masakadza, was ruled out of the tour due to injury, with Peter Moor named as the ODI captain in his place. Also missing for Zimbabwe was experienced batsman Brendan Taylor, who was ruled out due to a calf muscle tear. Zimbabwe Cricket announced that the profits from the third ODI match of the tour would go to the Cyclone Idai relief efforts. Zimbabwe's former captain, Graeme Cremer, worked as a coaching consultant for the UAE team for the tour, after Cremer moved from Zimbabwe to Dubai earlier in the year.

Zimbabwe won the series 4–0.

Squads

Ryan Burl was added to Zimbabwe's squad for the third and fourth ODIs.

Tour match

50-over match: Zimbabwe Chairman's XI vs United Arab Emirates

Fixtures

1st ODI

2nd ODI

3rd ODI

4th ODI

References

External links
 Series home at ESPN Cricinfo

2019 in Emirati cricket
2019 in Zimbabwean cricket
International cricket competitions in 2018–19
International cricket tours of Zimbabwe